Mount Horrid is a summit in Addison and Windsor counties, Vermont in the United States.

Peregrine falcons make their nests in the Great Cliffs of Mount Horrid. A moderately difficult trail leads hikers to the Great Cliffs.

References

Mountains of Addison County, Vermont
Mountains of Windsor County, Vermont
Mountains of Vermont